Le braghe del padrone is a 1978 Italian comedy film directed by Flavio Mogherini and starring Enrico Montesano. It is based on the novel with the same name written by Italo Terzoli and Enrico Vaime.

Cast
 Enrico Montesano - Vittorio Pieroni
 Milena Vukotic - Liliana (Lilly)
 Paolo Poli - Il diavolo
 Adolfo Celi - Eugenio, il presidente
 Enrico Beruschi: Arch. Arturo Silvestri, segretario generale
 Eugene Walter: Avv. De Dominicis, cognato di Eugenio
 Felice Andreasi: Dott. Verzelli, capo ufficio
 Vanna Brosio: intervistatrice Rai-TV
 Annabella Incontrera: la moglie di Eugenio

References

External links

1978 films
1978 comedy films
1970s Italian-language films
Italian comedy films
Films directed by Flavio Mogherini
Films scored by Riz Ortolani
1970s Italian films